José Luis Trejo Montoya (born 4 August 1951) is a Mexican former professional footballer and current manager of Real Estelí.

Career
Trejo played club football for Atlético Español and Tecos.

Trejo has coached Toros de Neza, Cruz Azul, Chiapas, C.F. Pachuca, UANL Tigres, Monarcas Morelia and Necaxa. He had managed more than 300 First Division matches.

Trejo took Cruz Azul to the Copa Libertadores de América final against Boca Juniors in 2001, which made Cruz Azul the first Mexico team to reach the Libertadores final. The game ended 1–1 on aggregate, and had to be determined on penalties.

In 2006, Trejo won the Clausura with Pachuca.

One day after he won the league, Trejo signed with Tigres to be their coach for one year. Despite having a good record for the first few games, the team began showing lack of commitment. Soon, the record showed eight consecutive games without winning, including a 7–0 defeat against Toluca, and all the responsibility was put on Trejo's management. His last game with Tigres was against Pachuca, the very same team he had made champion a year before. After the team lost 5–0, he was fired on 1 October 2006. Trejo was not unemployed for long, as he was hired by Necaxa after manager Hugo Sánchez left to coach the Mexico national team.

He was fired from UAG Tecos in 2008. He was next employed with the Liga MX Mexican Primera División club San Luis.

On 4 September 2013, Trejo became the new manager of UNAM.
 On August 15, 2014, after UNAM suffered their 4th consecutive loss, Trejo was sacked and David Patiño was named interim coach.

References

External links

1951 births
Living people
Association football defenders
Footballers from Hidalgo (state)
Olympic footballers of Mexico
Footballers at the 1972 Summer Olympics
Atlético Español footballers
Tecos F.C. footballers
Mexican football managers
Cruz Azul managers
Chiapas F.C. managers
C.F. Pachuca managers
Tigres UANL managers
Club Necaxa managers
Atlético Morelia managers
Tecos F.C. managers
Club Puebla managers
San Luis F.C. managers
Club Universidad Nacional managers
Mexican footballers